The 1973 AKRON TENNIS OPEN  was a women's tennis tournament played on indoor carpet courts at the University of Akron Memorial Hall in Akron, Ohio in the United States that was part of the 1973 Women's Grand Prix Circuit (B class). It was the inaugural edition of the tournament and was held from March 19 through March 25, 1973. Chris Evert won the singles title and the accompanying $6,000 first-prize money.

Start of Evert – Navratilova rivalry 

In the first round of the tournament Chris Evert played and won against Martina Navratilova in straight sets, 7–6(5–1), 6–3, after Navartilova had failed to serve out the first set at 6–5 and 30–0. It was their first encounter on the professional tour and the start of their rivalry which would comprise 80 matches and last until 1988.

Finals

Singles
 Chris Evert defeated  Olga Morozova 6–3, 6–4
 It was Evert's 2nd singles title of the year and the 13th of her career.

Doubles
 Patti Hogan /  Sharon Walsh defeated  Patricia Bostrom /  Michèle Gurdal 7–5, 6–4

References

Virginia Slims of Akron
Virginia Slims of Akron
Tennis tournaments in Ohio
Virginia Slims of Akron
Virginia Slims of Akron